Gannets are seabirds comprising the genus Morus in the family Sulidae, closely related to boobies.

Gannets are large white birds with yellowish heads, black-tipped wings and long bills. The other two species occur in the temperate seas around southern Africa, southern Australia, and New Zealand.

Etymology 
"Gannet" is derived from Old English ganot meaning "strong or masculine", ultimately from the same Old Germanic root as "gander".

Taxonomy 
Morus is derived from Ancient Greek  moros "stupid" or "foolish" due to lack of fear shown by breeding gannets and boobies, allowing them to be easily killed.

Behaviour

Hunting 

 They have no external nostrils; they are located inside the mouth, instead.
 They have air sacs in the face and chest under the skin, which act like bubble wrap, cushioning the impact with the water.
 The position of their eyes is far enough forward on the face for binocular vision, allowing them to judge distances accurately.

The gannet's supposed capacity for eating large quantities of fish has led to "gannet" becoming a description of somebody with a voracious appetite.

Mating and nesting 

Gannets are  colonial breeders on islands and coasts, normally laying one chalky-blue egg. They lack brood patches and use their webbed feet to warm the eggs. They reach maturity around 5 years of age. First-year birds are completely black, and subsequent subadult plumages show increasing amounts of white.

Northern gannets 
The most important nesting ground for northern gannets is the United Kingdom, with about two-thirds of the world's population. These live mainly in Scotland, including the Shetland Isles. The rest of the world's northern-gannet population nests in Canada, Ireland, the Faroe Islands, and Iceland, with small numbers in France (they are often seen in the Bay of Biscay), the Channel Islands, Norway, and a single colony in Germany on Heligoland. The biggest northern-gannet colony is on Scotland's Bass Rock in the Firth of Forth; in 2014, this colony contained some 75,000 pairs.
 Sulasgeir off the coast of the Isle of Lewis, St. Kilda, Grassholm in Pembrokeshire, Bempton Cliffs in the East Riding of Yorkshire, Sceilig Bheag, Ireland, and Bonaventure Island, Quebec, are also important northern-gannet breeding sites.

Systematics and evolution

The three gannet species are now usually placed in the genus Morus, Abbott's booby in Papasula, and the remaining boobies in Sula. However, some authorities believe that all nine sulid species should be considered congeneric, in Sula. At one  time, the various gannet species were considered to be a single species.

Most fossil gannets are from the Late Miocene or Pliocene,  when the diversity of seabirds in general was much higher than today. The cause the decline in species at the end of the Pleistocene is not clear; increased competition due to the spread of marine mammals may have played a role.

The genus Morus is much better documented in the fossil record than Sula, though the latter is more numerous today. The reasons are not clear; boobies possibly were better adapted or simply "lucky" to occur in the right places for dealing with the challenges of the Late Pliocene ecological change, or  many more fossil boobies could still await discovery. Notably, gannets are today restricted to temperate oceans, while boobies are also found in tropical waters, whereas several of the prehistoric gannet species had a more equatorial distribution than their congeners of today.

Fossil species of gannets are:

 Morus loxostylus (Early Miocene of EC USA) – includes M. atlanticus
 Morus olsoni (Middle Miocene of Romania)
 Morus lompocanus (Lompoc Late Miocene of Lompoc, USA)
 Morus magnus (Late Miocene of California)
 Morus peruvianus (Pisco Late Miocene of Peru)
 Morus vagabundus (Temblor Late Miocene of California)
 Morus willetti (Late Miocene of California) – formerly in Sula
 Morus sp. (Temblor Late Miocene of Sharktooth Hill, US: Miller 1961) – possibly M. magnus
 Morus sp. 1 (Late Miocene/Early Pliocene of Lee Creek Mine, US)
 Morus sp. 2 (Late Miocene/Early Pliocene of Lee Creek Mine, US)
 Morus peninsularis (Early Pliocene)
 Morus recentior (Middle Pliocene of California, US)
 Morus reyanus – Del Rey gannet (Late Pleistocene of W US)

Cultural references
In many parts of the United Kingdom, the term "gannet" is used to refer to people who steadily eat vast quantities of food, especially at public functions.

Young gannets were historically used as a food source, a tradition still practised in Ness, Scotland, where they are called "guga".  Like examples of continued traditional whale harvesting, the modern-day hunting of gannet chicks results in great controversies as to whether it should continue to be afforded "exemption from the ordinary protection afforded to sea birds in UK and EU law". The Ness hunt is currently limited to 2,000 chicks per year, and dates back at least to the Iron Age. The hunt is considered to be sustainable, as between 1902 and 2003, gannet numbers in Scotland increased dramatically from 30,000 to 180,000.

In "The Bookshop Sketch", originally from At Last the 1948 Show (1967), a customer (Marty Feldman) asks the bookshop proprietor (John Cleese) for "the expurgated version" of Olsen's Standard Book of British Birds, "the one without the gannet", because he does not like gannets due to their "long nasty beaks". Desperate to satisfy the customer, the proprietor tears the page about the gannet out of the book and also broadcast in 1970 with (John Junkin). The sketch is reprised in Monty Python's Contractual Obligation Album, where the customer (Graham Chapman) says he does not like the gannet because "they wet their nests."

In Series 1, Episode 3 of The F Word, Gordon Ramsay travels to the northwestern coast of Scotland and is shown how to prepare, cook, and eat gannet.

References

External links

 Gannet videos on the Internet Bird Collection

 
Seabirds
Taxa named by Louis Jean Pierre Vieillot